British Iraqis  are British citizens who originate from Iraq.

The three main ethnicities within the British Iraqi community are Arabs, Kurds and Turkmen, according to a publication by the International Organization for Migration. There are also smaller Christian, Mandaean and Yazidi communities.

History
The UK has had a significant Iraqi population since the late 1940s. Refugees including liberal and radical intellectuals dissatisfied with the monarchist regime moved to the UK at this time. Supporters of the monarchy subsequently fled to the UK after it was overthrown. According to an International Organization for Migration mapping exercise, many settled Iraqi migrants in the UK moved for educational purposes or to seek a better life in the 1950s and 1960s. Some members of religious minorities were also forced to leave Iraq in the 1950s. Other Iraqis migrated to the UK to seek political asylum during the dictatorship of Saddam Hussein, with large number of Kurds and Shi'a Muslims in particular migrating in the 1970s and 1980s, or as a result of the instability that followed the 2003 invasion of Iraq.

Demographics

Population size
The 2001 UK Census recorded 32,236 Iraqi-born residents. The 2011 UK Census recorded 70,426 Iraqi-born residents in England, 2,548 in Wales, 2,246 in Scotland  and 75 in Northern Ireland. The Office for National Statistics estimates that, as of 2020, the UK-wide figure was around 58,000.

According to estimates by the Iraqi embassy in 2007, the Iraqi population in the UK was around 350,000–450,000.  At the time of the Iraqi parliamentary election in January 2005, the International Herald Tribune suggested that 250,000 Iraqi exiles were living in the UK, with an estimated 150,000 eligible to vote.

Population distribution
According to community leaders in March 2007, there are around 150,000 Iraqis in London, 35,000 in Birmingham, 18,000 in Manchester, 8,000 in Cardiff and 5,000 in Glasgow.

Ethnicity
According to the International Organization for Migration, the three largest ethnic groups in the British Iraqi community are Arabs, Iraqi Kurds and Iraqi Turkmen. In particular, the Kurds form the most numerous of these ethnic groups. Moreover, they also form the largest Kurdish community in the UK, exceeding the numbers from Turkey and Iran.

There are also sizeable numbers of Chaldeans, Assyrians Armenians, Mandaeans and other ethnic groups, such as Iraqi Jews, Yezidi, Shabakis and Kawliya.

According to the 2011 Census, Iraqi-born England and Wales residents most commonly gave their ethnicity as Arab (39%), "any other ethnic group" (28%) and Asian (17%).

Religion
Although the majority of Iraqis are Muslim (Shia and Sunni), there are also minorities including Chaldeans and Assyrian Christians,  Jews, and followers of Mandaeism, Yazidism, Shabakism and Yarsan.

Notable individuals

Notable Iraqi names in Britain include:
 Conservative MP and former Chancellor of the Exchequer Nadhim Zahawi,
 Labour politician and current Deputy Mayor of London-Lambeth Sarbaz Barznji. 
 actor, producer and director Andy Serkis,
 Mothercare founder Selim Zilkha, 
 advertising agents Saatchi & Saatchi,
 architect Dame Zaha Hadid (DBE, RA),
 broadcaster Alan Yentob, 
 theoretical physicist Jim Al-Khalili (OBE),
 hip hop artist Lowkey, 
 the billionaire founder of Investcorp, Nemir Kirdar, and his daughter, the author and socialite, Rena Kirdar Sindi.

See also
British Arabs
British Assyrians
British Kurds
British Turks
Iraqi people

References

Further reading

External links
 British Iraqi Friendship Society
 Iraqi Community Association
 Iraqi Welfare Association
 Iraqi Youth Foundation

 

Arabs in the United Kingdom
 
 
Iraq
Muslim communities in Europe
Iraqi diaspora in Europe